City Hall is a 2020 American documentary film directed, edited, and co-produced by Frederick Wiseman. It explores the government of Boston, Massachusetts.

The film had its world premiere at the 77th Venice International Film Festival on September 8, 2020. It was released through virtual cinema on October 28, 2020, by Zipporah Films, followed by a broadcast on PBS on December 22, 2020.

Synopsis
The film explores the government of Boston, Massachusetts, from racial justice, housing, climate change action and more. Wiseman's documentaries do not have a standard narrative arc, narration, or interviews, but are based on observation of day-to-day organizational life, in this case the activities of Boston's city government in fall 2018 and winter 2019. Much of the film follows Mayor Marty Walsh in activities such as meetings with aides at City Hall, addressing business leaders about the impact of climate change on the Harbor, listening to veterans at Faneuil Hall on November 11, observing Thanksgiving Day at Goodwill Industries, and giving his state of the city address at Symphony Hall. A second major theme of the film is public servants helping people in need: the eviction prevention task force, another task force on economic advancement for Latina women, and an economic development adviser working with an ethnically-focused grocery store.

On numerous instances the Mayor and public servants complain about the policies of the Trump Administration. In an interview done for the Toronto International Film Festival, Wiseman says, "City Hall is an anti-Trump film because the mayor and the people who work for him believe in democratic norms. They represent everything Donald Trump doesn't stand for."

Release
The film had its world premiere at the 2020 Venice Film Festival on September 8, 2020. It also screened at the Toronto International Film Festival on September 14, 2020, and the New York Film Festival on September 25, 2020. The film was released through virtual cinema on October 28, 2020, by Zipporah Films. The film was broadcast on PBS in the United States on December 22, 2020.

Reception
City Hall received positive reviews from most film critics. The site's critical consensus reads, "A glimpse of local government at work that's as patiently observant as it is engrossing, City Hall adds another insightful gem to master documentarian Frederick Wiseman's filmography." On Metacritic, the film holds a rating of 88 out of 100, based on 17 critics, indicating "universal acclaim".

Cahiers du Cinéma named it the best film of 2020.

References

External links
 
 
 Official website
 Zipporah Films

2020 films
American documentary films
Documentary films about cities in the United States
Documentary films about global warming
Documentary films about Massachusetts
Documentaries about racism
Documentary films about American politicians
Films directed by Frederick Wiseman
Government of Boston
PBS original programming
2020s English-language films
2020s American films